Peter Verhoek (born 16 September 1955 in Auckland) was a New Zealand cricketer who played for Central Districts Stags. He scored 171 runs in seven first class matches.

External links
 
 

1955 births
Living people
Cricketers from Auckland
New Zealand cricketers
Central Districts cricketers
20th-century New Zealand people